is a Japanese politician of the Social Democratic Party. He was born in Yame city in Fukuoka prefecture. He entered Kyoto University in 1969 before leaving part-way through his degree and moving to Osaka to work, where he became active with the trade union movement.

In the House of Councillors 2007 election he ran for the House of Councillors in Osaka, but was defeated. He became the private secretary of Tokushin Yamauchi, an SDP member of the House of Councillors.

In the 2009 general election he was elected as the House of Representatives member representing the Kinki block.

References

External links 
  

1950 births
Living people
Japanese trade unionists
Kyoto University alumni
Members of the House of Representatives (Japan)
Politicians from Fukuoka Prefecture
Social Democratic Party (Japan) politicians
21st-century Japanese politicians